Community health refers to simple health services that are delivered by laymen outside hospitals and clinics. Community health is also the subset of public health that is taught to and practiced by clinicians. Community health volunteers and community health workers work with primary care providers to facilitate entry into, exit from and utilization of the formal health system by community members.

Community health is a major field of study within the medical and clinical sciences which focuses on the maintenance, protection, and improvement of the health status of population groups and communities. It is a distinct field of study that may be taught within a separate school of public health or Preventive Healthcare. The WHO defines community health as:Environmental, Social, and Economic resources to sustain emotional and physical well being among people in ways that advance their aspirations and satisfy their needs in their unique environment.Medical interventions that occur in communities can be classified as three categories: Primary care, Secondary care, and Tertiary care. Each category focuses on a different level and approach towards the community or population group. In the United States, Community health is rooted within Primary healthcare achievements. Primary healthcare programs aim to reduce risk factors and increase health promotion and prevention. Secondary healthcare is related to "hospital care" where acute care is administered in a hospital department setting. Tertiary healthcare refers to highly specialized care usually involving disease or disability management.

The success of community health programs relies upon the transfer of information from health professionals to the general public using one-to-one or one-to-many communication (mass communication). The latest shift is towards health marketing.

Community health services are classified into categories including:
 Preventive health services such as chemoprophylaxis for Tuberculosis, cancer screening and treatment of diabetes and hypertension.
 Promotive health services such as Health education,  family planning, vaccination and nutritional supplementation
 Curative health services such as treatment of jiggers, lice infestation, Malaria and Pneumonia.
 Rehabilitative health services such as provision of prosthetics, Social work, Occupational therapy, Physical therapy, Counselling and other Mental health services.

Community health workers and volunteers 
Community health workers (also known as community health assistants and community health officers) are local public health workers with a deep understanding of their community's health needs and challenges. They serve as a bridge between their community and local health systems to ensure high quality and culturally competent service delivery. They have vocational, professional or academic qualifications which enable them to provide training, supervisory, administrative, teaching and research services in community health departments.

Community health volunteers are members of a local community who have experience and training on the health problems prevalent in their community and care services available, in order to identify and link those in need with local providers. Community health volunteers may be referred to by different titles depending on their local health system; these titles can included lay health workers, health volunteers, village health agents, non-specialist healthcare providers, and village health agents.

Community health volunteers provide basic services such as distribution of water chlorination tablets, mosquito nets and health education material. They will involve or work with registered clinicians when they encounter sick or recovering patients or those with complex or ongoing needs.

Measuring community health 
Community health is generally measured by Geographical Information Systems and Demographic data. Geographic Information Systems can be used to define sub-communities when neighborhood location data is not enough. Traditionally Community health has been measured using sampling data which was then compared to well-known data sets, like the National Health Interview Survey or National Health and Nutrition Examination Survey. With technological development, information systems could store more data for small-scale communities, cities, and towns; as opposed to census data that only generalize information about small populations based on the overall population. Geographical Information Systems (GIS) can give more precise information about community resources, even at neighborhood levels. The ease of use of Geographic Information Systems (GIS), advances in multilevel statistics, and spatial analysis methods make it easier for researchers to procure and generate data related to the built environment.

Social media can also play a big role in health information analytics. Studies have found social media being capable of influencing people to change their unhealthy behaviors and encourage interventions capable of improving health status.  Social media statistics combined with Geographical Information Systems (GIS) may provide researchers with a more complete image of community standards for health and well being.

Categories of community health

Primary Healthcare and Primary Prevention 
Community-based health promotion emphasizes Primary Prevention and population-based perspective (traditional prevention).  It is the goal of Community Health to have individuals in a certain community improve their lifestyle or seek medical attention. Primary Healthcare is provided by health professionals, specifically the ones a patient sees first that may refer them to Secondary or Tertiary care.

Primary prevention refers to the early avoidance and identification of risk factors that may lead to certain diseases and disabilities. Community-focused efforts including immunizations, classroom teaching, and awareness campaigns are all good examples of how primary prevention techniques are utilized by communities to change certain health behaviors. Prevention programs, if carefully designed and drafted, can effectively prevent problems that children and adolescents face as they grow up.  This finding also applies to all groups and classes of people. Prevention programs are one of the most effective tools health professionals can use to significantly impact individual, population, and community health.

Secondary Healthcare and Secondary Prevention 
Community health can also be improved with improvements in individuals' environments. Community health status is determined by the environmental characteristics, behavioral characteristics, social cohesion in the environment of that community.  Appropriate modifications in the environment can help to prevent unhealthy behaviors and negative health outcomes.

Secondary prevention refers to improvements made in a patient's lifestyle or environment after the onset of disease or disability. This sort of prevention works to make life easier for the patient since it's too late to prevent them from their current disease or disability. An example of secondary prevention is when those with occupational low back pain are provided with strategies to stop their health status from worsening; the prospects of secondary prevention may even hold more promise than primary prevention in this case.

Tertiary Healthcare 
In Tertiary healthcare, community health can only be affected with professional medical care involving the entire population. Patients need to be referred to specialists and undergo advanced medical treatment. In some countries, there are more sub-specialties of medical professions than there are primary care specialists.  Health inequalities are directly related to social advantage and social resources.

Challenges and difficulties in community health 

The complexity of community health and its various problems can make it difficult for researchers to assess and identify solutions. Community-Based Participatory Research (CBPR) is a unique alternative that combines community participation, inquiry, and action. Community-Based Participatory Research (CBPR) helps researchers address community issues with a broader lens and also works with the people in the community to find culturally sensitive, valid, and reliable methods and approaches.

Other issues involve access and cost of medical care. A great majority of the world does not have adequate health insurance. In low-income countries, less than 40% of total health expenditures are paid for by the public/government. Community health, even Population health, is not encouraged as health sectors in developing countries are not able to link the national authorities with the local government and community action.

In the United States, the Affordable Care Act (ACA) changed the way community health centers operate and the policies that were in place, greatly influencing community health. The ACA directly affected community health centers by increasing funding, expanding insurance coverage for Medicaid, reforming the Medicaid payment system, appropriating $1.5 billion to increase the workforce and promote training. The impact, importance, and success of the Affordable Care Act is still being studied and will have a large impact on how ensuring health can affect community standards on health and also individual health.

Ethnic disparities in health statuses among different communities are also a cause of concern. Community coalition-driven interventions may bring benefits to this segment of society. This also relates to language usage, where results from a 2019 systematic review found that patients with limited English proficiency who received care from physicians who communicate in the patient's own preferred language generally had improved health outcomes.

Community health resolutions 
Each community is different and should create its own Community Health Improvement Process also known as CHIP. A CHIP consists of problem identification and prioritization cycle along with an analysis and implementation cycle. Five strategies that assist the CHIP process are improving community health and well-being; community involvement, political commitment; healthy public policy; multi-sectoral collaboration; and asset-based community development. An asset-based approach involves empowering individuals and communities by focusing on community strengths along with the skills of the individuals.

The CDC makes states that Individuals who are in good physical shape, have proper vaccination, have access to clinical services and medications, and know where to get critical health and emergency alert information create a better community than those who have poor health and don't understand where to get proper treatment and medicine.

The Problem identification and prioritization cycle have three phases that help benefit the community which is forming a health coalition, collecting and analyzing data for health profile, and identifying critical health issues. The information that is gathered is also distributed to the community to help with important decision-making.

Following this cycle is the Analysis and Implementation Cycle which helps resolve community health problems by analyzing the health issue, establishing resources, creating a health improvement strategy with the resources, and allocating responsibility throughout the community. Multiple issues are analyzed in conjunction to determine which is most important. Lastly,  the authority to act is implemented, sufficient funds are allocated and access to data is released in order for the members of the community to review and move accordingly.

Community health in the Global South 
Access to community health in the Global South is influenced by geographic accessibility (physical distance from the service delivery point to the user), availability (proper type of care, service provider, and materials), financial accessibility (willingness and ability of users to purchase services), and acceptability (responsiveness of providers to social and cultural norms of users and their communities). While the Epidemiological transition is shifting the disease burden from communicable to noncommunicable conditions in developing countries, this transition is still in an early stage in parts of the Global South such as South Asia, the Middle East, and Sub-Saharan Africa. Two phenomena in developing countries have created a "medical poverty trap" for underserved communities in the Global South — the introduction of user fees for public healthcare services and the growth of out-of-pocket expenses for private services. The private healthcare sector is being increasingly utilized by low and middle income communities in the Global South for conditions such as malaria, tuberculosis, and sexually transmitted infections. Private care is characterized by more flexible access, shorter waiting times, and greater choice. Private providers that serve low-income communities are often unqualified and untrained. Some policymakers recommend that governments in developing countries harness private providers to remove state responsibility from service provision.

Community development is frequently used as a public health intervention to empower communities to obtain self-reliance and control over the factors that affect their health. Community health workers are able to draw on their firsthand experience, or local knowledge, to complement the information that scientists and policy makers use when designing health interventions. Interventions with community health workers have been shown to improve access to primary healthcare and quality of care in developing countries through reduced malnutrition rates, improved maternal and child health and prevention and management of HIV/AIDS. Community health workers have also been shown to promote chronic disease management by improving the clinical outcomes of patients with diabetes, hypertension, and cardiovascular diseases.

Slum-dwellers in the Global South face threats of infectious disease, non-communicable conditions, and injuries due to violence and road traffic accidents. Participatory, multi-objective slum upgrading in the urban sphere significantly improves social determinants that shape health outcomes such as safe housing, food access, political and gender rights, education, and employment status. Efforts have been made to involve the urban poor in project and policy design and implementation. Through slum upgrading, states recognize and acknowledge the rights of the urban poor and the need to deliver basic services. Upgrading can vary from small-scale sector-specific projects (i.e. water taps, paved roads) to comprehensive housing and infrastructure projects (i.e. piped water, sewers). Other projects combine environmental interactions with social programs and political empowerment. Recently, slum upgrading projects have been incremental to prevent the displacement of residents during improvements and attentive to emerging concerns regarding climate change adaptation. By legitimizing slum-dwellers and their right to remain, slum upgrading is an alternative to slum removal and a process that in itself may address the structural determinants of population health.

Kenya 
Community health refers to the first level of health services provision in Kenya that comprises;
 Interventions focusing on building demand for existing health and related services, by improving community awareness and health seeking behavior and 2. Taking defined interventions and services as defined in (Kenya Health Sector  Strategic and investment plan  KHSSP) close to the community and households.
The current registered association  for community Health professionals in Kenya is The Society of Community Health Caregivers. It was registered in the year 2020 to act as an umbrella body for the community health professionals.

Academic resources 
 Journal of Urban Health, Springer.  (electronic)  (paper).
 International Quarterly of Community Health Education, Sage Publications.  (electronic),  (paper).
 Global Public Health, Informa Healthcare.   (paper).
 Journal of Community Health, Springer. .
 Family and Community Health, Lippincott Williams & Wilkins.  (electronic).
 Health Promotion Practice, Sage Publications.  (electronic)  (paper).
 Journal of Health Services Research and Policy, Sage Publications.  (electronic)  (paper).
 BMC Health Sciences Research, Biomed Central.  (electronic).
 Health Services Research, Wiley-Blackwell.  (electronic).
 Health Communication and Literacy: An Annotated Bibliography, Centre for Literacy of Quebec. .

See also 
 Community health agent
 Community health center
 Community mental health service
 Online health communities
 Prison reform
 University of Community Health, Magway

References

Further reading 
 
 John Sanbourne Bockoven (1963). Moral Treatment in American Psychiatry, New York: Springer Publishing Co.

External links 

 Health marketing- CDC

Public health
Health